Avril K. Henry (5 April 1935 – 20 April 2016) was an English activist who campaigned for the legalisation of voluntary euthanasia and former professor of English medieval culture at the University of Exeter. In her works Dr. Henry researched theory of typology.

Henry was born in Lincoln, Lincolnshire to Royal Air Force officer Robert Charles Henry and Eileen Florence Whattam Henry. She committed suicide at her home in Brampford Speke, Devon, near Exeter, on 20 April 2016, aged 81. Her home had been raided by police the previous week after they were tipped off by Interpol that she had bought a euthanasia kit from Mexico.

Selected publications
Biblia Pauperum. Scolar, Aldershot, 1987; 
The Mirour of Mans Saluacioune: a Middle English translation of Speculum humanae salvationis: a critical edition of the fifteenth-century manuscript illustrated from Der Spiegel der Meschen Behaltnis, Speyer, Drach, c. 1475; University of Pennsylvania Press, 1987; 
The Eton Roundels: Eton College MS 177 'Figurae Bibliorum' A Colour Facsimile With Transcription, Translation and Commentary;

References

1935 births
2016 deaths
Suicides in England
People from Lincoln, England
Euthanasia activists
Academics of the University of Exeter